Latent heat (also known as latent energy or heat of transformation) is energy released or absorbed, by a body or a thermodynamic system, during a constant-temperature process — usually a first-order phase transition.

Latent heat can be understood as energy in hidden form which is supplied or extracted to change the state of a substance without changing its temperature. Examples are latent heat of fusion and latent heat of vaporization involved in phase changes, i.e. a substance condensing or vaporizing at a specified temperature and pressure.

The term was introduced around 1762 by Scottish chemist Joseph Black. It is derived from the Latin latere (to lie hidden). Black used the term in the context of calorimetry where a heat transfer caused a volume change in a body while its temperature was constant.

In contrast to latent heat, sensible heat is energy transferred as heat, with a resultant temperature change in a body.

Usage

The terms ″sensible heat″ and ″latent heat″ refer to energy transferred between a body and its surroundings, defined by the occurrence or non-occurrence of temperature change;  they depend on the properties of the body. ″Sensible heat″ is ″sensed″ or felt in a process as a change in the body's temperature. ″Latent heat″ is energy transferred in a process without change of the body's temperature, for example, in a phase change (solid/liquid/gas).

Both sensible and latent heats are observed in many processes of transfer of energy in nature. Latent heat is associated with the change of phase of atmospheric or ocean water,  vaporization, condensation, freezing or melting, whereas sensible heat is energy transferred that is evident in change of the temperature of the atmosphere or ocean, or ice, without those phase changes, though it is associated with changes of pressure and volume.

The original usage of the term, as introduced by Black, was applied to systems that were intentionally held at constant temperature. Such usage referred to latent heat of expansion and several other related latent heats. These latent heats are defined independently of the conceptual framework of thermodynamics.

When a body is heated at constant temperature by thermal radiation in a microwave field for example, it may expand by an amount described by its latent heat with respect to volume or latent heat of expansion, or increase its pressure by an amount described by its latent heat with respect to pressure. 
Latent heat is energy released or absorbed, by a body or a thermodynamic system, during a constant-temperature process.
Two common forms of latent heat are latent heat of fusion (melting) and latent heat of vaporization (boiling).  These names describe the direction of energy flow when changing from one phase to the next: from solid to liquid, and liquid to gas.

In both cases the change is endothermic, meaning that the system absorbs energy.
For example, when water evaporates, energy is required for the water molecules to overcome the forces of attraction between them, the transition from water to vapor requires an input of energy.

If the vapor then condenses to a liquid on a surface, then the vapor's latent energy absorbed during evaporation is released as the liquid's sensible heat onto the surface.

The large value of the enthalpy of condensation of water vapor is the reason that steam is a far more effective heating medium than boiling water, and is more hazardous.

Meteorology
In meteorology, latent heat flux is the flux of energy from the Earth's surface to the atmosphere that is associated with evaporation or transpiration of water at the surface and subsequent condensation of water vapor in the troposphere. It is an important component of Earth's surface energy budget.  Latent heat flux has been commonly measured with the Bowen ratio technique, or more recently since the mid-1900s by the eddy covariance method.

History
The English word latent comes from Latin latēns, meaning lying hidden. The term latent heat was introduced into calorimetry around 1750 by Joseph Black—commissioned by producers of Scotch whisky in search of ideal quantities of fuel and water for their distilling process—to studying system changes, such as of volume and pressure, when the thermodynamic system was held at constant temperature in a thermal bath. Black would compare the change in temperature of two identical quantities of water, heated by identical means, one of which was, say, melted from ice, whereas the other was heated from merely cold liquid state. By comparing the resulting temperatures, he could conclude that, for instance, the temperature of the sample melted from ice was 140°F lower than the other sample, thus melting the ice absorbed 140 "degrees of heat" that could not be measured by the thermometer, yet needed to be supplied, thus it was "latent" (hidden). Black also deduced that as much latent heat as was supplied into boiling the distillate (thus giving the quantity of fuel needed) also had to be absorbed to condense it again (thus giving the cooling water required).

Later, James Prescott Joule characterised latent energy as the energy of interaction in a given configuration of particles, i.e. a form of potential energy, and the sensible heat as an energy that was indicated by the thermometer, relating the latter to thermal energy.

Specific latent heat
A specific latent heat (L) expresses the amount of energy in the form of heat (Q) required to completely effect a phase change of a unit of mass (m), usually , of a substance as an intensive property:

Intensive properties are material characteristics and are not dependent on the size or extent of the sample. Commonly quoted and tabulated in the literature are the specific latent heat of fusion and the specific latent heat of vaporization for many substances.

From this definition, the latent heat for a given mass of a substance is calculated by

where:
Q is the amount of energy released or absorbed during the change of phase of the substance (in kJ or in BTU),
m is the mass of the substance (in kg or in lb), and
L is the specific latent heat for a particular substance (kJ kg−1 or in BTU lb−1), either Lf for fusion, or Lv for vaporization.

Table of specific latent heats
The following table shows the specific latent heats and change of phase temperatures (at standard pressure) of some common fluids and gases.

Specific latent heat for condensation of water in clouds

The specific latent heat of condensation of water in the temperature range from −25 °C to 40 °C is approximated by the following empirical cubic function:

where the temperature  is taken to be the numerical value in °C.

For sublimation and deposition from and into ice, the specific latent heat is almost constant in the temperature range from −40 °C to 0 °C and can be approximated by the following empirical quadratic function:

Variation with temperature (or pressure)

As the temperature (or pressure) rises to the critical point, the latent heat of vaporization falls to zero.

See also
Bowen ratio
Eddy covariance flux (eddy correlation, eddy flux)
Sublimation (physics)
Specific heat capacity
Enthalpy of fusion
Enthalpy of vaporization

References

Thermochemistry
Atmospheric thermodynamics
Thermodynamics
Physical phenomena